Two of Us is the second studio album by Azu, released on 17 March 2010. "Happily Ever After" was used as the ending theme song for the TV program Ousama no Brunch. The album reached #13 on the Oricon weekly charts and charted for nine weeks.

Catalog number 
 BVCL-83/4 (limited edition)
 BVCL-85 (regular edition)

Track listing
 CD 
 Intro from Radio 13
 Hot like Fire
 Happily Ever After
 Ima Sugu ni... (いますぐに…; Right Now...)
 Anata ni Aitakute featuring Spontania (あなたに愛たくて; I Want to Meet You)
 For You
 Beautiful Dreamer
 Oh Baby featuring Kusakawa Shun
 I Will
 You & I featuring LOVE LOVE LOVE
 Love Groovin' featuring KURO (from HOME MADE Kazoku)
 Onegai! (おねがい!; Please!) (AZU-ko Sensei featuring SEAMO-kun)
 What Girls Want
 Letter... ~Taisetsu na Hito e~ (letter... ~大切なひとへ~)

 DVD 
 "As One" music videos
 Cherish
 Jewel Sky
 Koiiro (コイイロ; Color of Love)
 Jikan yo Tomare featuring SEAMO (時間よ止まれ; Stop Time) 
 Rainbow
 Mobile Music DOR@MO "I Will" (alternative ending)
 AZU TV (making and offshoot)

Charts

Total reported sales: 22,427

External links
Oricon Profile: Limited Edition | Regular Edition
Sony Music Profile: Limited Edition | Regular Edition

2010 albums